Tompkins may refer to:

Places  
Tompkins, New York, USA 
Tompkins County, New York, USA
 Tompkins Township, Warren County, Illinois, USA
 Tompkins Township, Jackson County, Michigan, USA
Tompkins, Saskatchewan, Canada
Tompkins, Newfoundland and Labrador, Canada

Other uses
 Tompkins (surname), including a list of people with the name

See also
 Tompkins Table, an annual ranking of Colleges of the University of Cambridge
 Tompkin, a surname
 Tomkins (disambiguation) 
 Justice Tompkins (disambiguation)